Eva Lim (born July 10, 1992, in Changsha, China) is a Dutch figure skater. She won the Dutch national title in the 2013–14 season. She competed internationally on the ISU Junior Grand Prix circuit and at the 2007 World Junior Figure Skating Championships. She missed most of the 2010–11 season due to injury.

Programs

Results
JGP: Junior Grand Prix

References

External links

 

Dutch female single skaters
1992 births
Living people
Sportspeople from Changsha
Sportspeople from Antwerp
Dutch people of Chinese descent